The BBC Allied Expeditionary Forces Programme was a national radio station during World War II in the mid-1940s.

History

Overview
Upon the outbreak of World War II on 1 September 1939, the BBC had merged its two nationwide radio stations – the National Programme and the Regional Programme (which were begun broadcasting on 9 March 1930) – into a single Home Service. On 7 January 1940, this was supplemented by a station aimed at the British Armed Forces serving at home (until Dunkirk in France and Belgium), the Forces Programme.

With the arrival of troops from United States and Canada in the run-up to Normandy landings (also known as 'D-Day'), the Forces Programme was replaced by a service more tailored to new audience as the General Forces Programme, which also broadcast on shortwave for service people in the Asian theatre of operations. When Operation Overlord, the Allied invasion of occupied Europe began, it was felt by the Allied governments that a joint service of entertainment, news and information for the fighting troops would be a better use of resources than providing separate services from American Forces Network and Canadian Broadcasting Corporation stations.

This combined station, called the Allied Expeditionary Forces Programme was fully operated by the BBC on behalf of the Allied forces, began broadcasting on 7 June 1944 (shortly after 'D-Day') with 514 metres (583 kHz) providing a service dominated by cabaret and swing music.

Closure
The station closed soon after Victory in Europe Day on 28 July 1945 when the British Forces Network, AFN and CBC had established their own services in the areas each force was occupying. The following day, BBC Light Programme began.

References

External links
 WWII Radio
 Radiomusications by Transdiffusion
 The BBC at War

BBC history
BBC Radio
Defunct BBC national radio stations
Radio stations established in 1944
Radio stations disestablished in 1945
1944 establishments in the United Kingdom
1945 disestablishments in the United Kingdom
1940s in the United Kingdom
United Kingdom in World War II
Radio during World War II
1944 in radio
1945 in radio
American Forces Network
CBC Radio
Military broadcasting